Giuseppe Diotti (1 March 1779 – 30 January 1846) was an Italian painter of the Neoclassic style.

Biography
He was born in Casalmaggiore. His full name was Francesco Giuseppe Antonio Diotti. He initially was apprenticed in his hometown to Paolo Araldi. As a teenager, until 1796, he attended the Academy at Parma and was there instructed by Carlo Calami. After a few years back at Casalmaggiore, he gained stipends to allow him to travel to Rome, where he was strongly influenced by the academic styles of both Gaspare Landi and Vincenzo Camuccini. He painted in fresco as well as in oil, distinguishing himself as a painter of historical subjects. From 1806 to 1809, he painted, among other topics, the Rest in Egypt, a Deposition, a Moses with Tablets, an Adoration by Shepherds, and Moses and the Bronze Serpent.

He then returned to Milan, and through his friendship with Andrea Appiani, he became a professor in the Accademia Carrara in Bergamo. He received many subsequent honors including membership in the Academies of Milan (Brera) in 1815, the Atheneum at Bergamo in 1819, the Atheneum at Brescia in 1829, the Accademia of Bologna in 1837, and the Roman Accademia di San Luca in 1844. He died in 1846 in Casalmaggiore. His former palace and studio is now the Museo Diotti.

Legacy

In the Belvedere at Vienna is a picture by him representing The Kiss of Judas, and in the Brera Gallery is a depiction of the Congress of Pontida (Oath of Pontida). Other  works by him are a Leonardo da Vinci and Lodovico Sforza and Tobias recovering his Sight. His self-portrait, dated 1821, is in the Uffizi. He also helped decorate, alongside Luigi Sabatelli, the frescoes (1818) at Palazzo Bolzesi in Cremona; the Bath of Venus at Palazzo Locatelli in Bergamo; and four frescoes in the Colleoni chapel in the Cathedral of Cremona.

Among his pupils were Giovanni Carnovali and Enrico Scuri, and he was a mentor and collaborator with Pietro Ronzoni.

Notes

References

Attribution
 

18th-century Italian painters
Italian male painters
19th-century Italian painters
People from Casalmaggiore
Painters from Bergamo
Painters from Parma
1779 births
1846 deaths
19th-century Italian male artists
18th-century Italian male artists